The Organización Deportiva Suramericana (ODESUR) is a multi-sports organisation.
They organize the South American Games.

Affiliates
There are 15 affiliated National Olympic Committees:

References

External links

 

Sports governing bodies in South America
Sports organizations established in 1976